Reggianito is an Argentine cheese that is a very hard, granular, cows' milk cheese. The cheese was developed by Italian immigrants to Argentina who wished to make a cheese reminiscent of their native Parmigiano Reggiano. The name—the Spanish diminutive of "Reggiano"—refers to the fact that the cheese is produced in small   wheels, rather than the huge Parmigiano-Reggiano drums.

The cheese is generally used for cooking or for grating over pasta dishes. The aging period of 5–6 months, although longer than that of any other South American hard cheese, is shorter than that of the year or more required for Parmigiano-Reggiano. 

In the years following World War I, Italian cheese makers recognized Reggianito as a serious competitor in the export market and this fact was instrumental in the setting up the Parmigiano-Reggiano consortium. In the United States, it is often sold as Parmesan.

References

Sources
History of the Parmigiano-Reggiano consortium from the Consorzio del Formaggio Parmigiano-Reggiano site

See also
Parmigiano Reggiano
Grana Padano

Argentine cheeses
Cow's-milk cheeses